Edmund Kelly (1658-1732) was an Irish prelate who served as Bishop of Clonfert.

Kelly was born in County Galway. was selected as Clonfert on 3 July 1717, and consecrated on 14 May 1718. He died in 1732.

References

Roman Catholic bishops of Clonfert
18th-century Roman Catholic bishops in Ireland
1732 deaths
People from County Galway
1658 births